Ambrosio Fracassini, O.P. (died 1663) was a Roman Catholic prelate who served as Bishop of Pula (1663).

Biography
Ambrosio Fracassini was born in Brescia, Italy on 8 Dec 1597 and ordained a priest in the Order of Preachers. On 12 Mar 1663, he was appointed by Pope Alexander VII as Bishop of Pula. On 27 Mar 1663, he was consecrated bishop by Scipione Pannocchieschi d'Elci, Archbishop of Pisa. He served as Bishop of Pula until his death on 22 Sep 1663.

References

External links and additional sources
 (for Chronology of Bishops) 
 (for Chronology of Bishops) 

17th-century Roman Catholic bishops in Croatia
1597 births
1663 deaths
Religious leaders from Brescia
Bishops appointed by Pope Alexander VII
Dominican bishops